Nancy Lee Maldonado (born November 28, 1975) is an American lawyer from Chicago who serves as a United States district judge of the United States District Court for the Northern District of Illinois.

Early life and education 

Maldonado was born on November 28, 1975, in Skokie, Illinois. She received a Bachelor of Arts, cum laude, from Harvard College in 1997 and a Juris Doctor from Columbia Law School in 2001.

Career 

Maldonado previously served as a law clerk for Judge Rubén Castillo of the United States District Court for the Northern District of Illinois from 2001 to 2003. In 2003, she joined the law firm of Miner, Barnhill & Galland in Chicago as an associate and became partner in 2010.

Notable cases 

In 2012, Maldonado was part of the legal team filing an amicus brief from the Brady Center to Prevent Gun Violence in a lawsuit challenging the Cook County Assault Weapons Ban under the Second Amendment.  

In 2014, Maldonado was part of the legal team that represented Maura Anne Stuart, a commercial driver whose gender discrimination suit was initially dismissed. Stuart brought a Title VII action against Local 727, International Brotherhood of Teamsters, charging that it had discriminated against her on the basis of her sex. The Seventh Circuit reversed the dismissal. 
   

In 2019, Maldonado represented Dilan Abreu, a 40-year veteran bricklayer who sued over workplace harassment over his race at the Chicago Department of Water Management.

Federal judicial service 

In December 2021, Maldonado was recommended to the president by Senators Dick Durbin and Tammy Duckworth. On April 13, 2022, President Joe Biden announced his intent to nominate Maldonado to serve as a United States District Judge of the United States District Court for the Northern District of Illinois. On April 25, 2022, her nomination was sent to the Senate. President Biden nominated Maldonado to the seat vacated by Judge Matthew Kennelly, who assumed senior status on October 7, 2021. On May 11, 2022, a hearing on her nomination was held before the Senate Judiciary Committee. On June 9, 2022, her nomination was favorably reported out of committee by a 13–9 vote. On July 19, 2022, the United States Senate invoked cloture on her nomination by a 53–41 vote. She was confirmed the same day by a 53–45 vote. She received her judicial commission on August 10, 2022. She became the first Hispanic woman to serve as a federal judge on the Court for the Northern District of Illinois.

See also 
 List of Hispanic/Latino American jurists

References

External links 

1975 births
Living people
21st-century American judges
21st-century American lawyers
21st-century American women lawyers
21st-century American women judges
Columbia Law School alumni
Harvard College alumni
Hispanic and Latino American judges
Hispanic and Latino American lawyers
Illinois lawyers
Judges of the United States District Court for the Northern District of Illinois
People from Skokie, Illinois
United States district court judges appointed by Joe Biden